The 2014 FIVB Volleyball World Grand Prix was the 22nd edition of the annual women's international volleyball tournament played by 28 countries from 25 July to 24 August 2014. The Group 1 final round was held in Tokyo, Japan. The Brazilian star team won the tournament for the tenth time, the second consecutive victory.

Qualification
No qualification tournament.
28 teams are invited.

Qualified teams

Format
It will be the first time the World Grand Prix will feature 28 teams.
During the Intercontinental Round, Pools A to O will play matches in three stand-alone tournaments, for a total of 9 matches per team. Pool P to S will feature two stand-alone tournaments, for a total of 6 matches per team.
Six teams will qualify for the World Grand Prix Finals featuring the top four teams from all matches, plus the winner of the Final Four of Group 2 and the hosts (if the hosts are one of the top four teams, then the fifth top team also participates).
The last ranked team of Group 1 after the Intercontinental Round could be relegated if the winner of the Final Four of Group 2 can meet the promotion requirements set by the FIVB.

Pools composition
The pools composition was announced on 1 December 2014.

Squads

Intercontinental round
All times are local.

Group 1

Ranking

|}

Week 1

Pool A
Venue: Baskent Volleyball Hall, Ankara, Turkey

|}

Pool B
Venue: Hwaseong Stadium, Hwaseong, South Korea

|}

Pool C
Venue: PalaSerradimigni, Sassari, Italy

|}

Week 2

Pool D
Venue: Ibirapuera Gymnasium, São Paulo, Brazil

|}

Pool E
Venue: Başkent Volleyball Hall, Ankara, Turkey

|}

Pool F
Venue: Hong Kong Coliseum, Hong Kong, China

|}

Week 3

Pool G
Venue: Indoor Stadium Huamark, Bangkok, Thailand

|}

Pool H
Venue: DS Yantarny, Kaliningrad, Russia

|}

Pool I
Venue: Macau Forum, Macau, China

|}

Group 2

Ranking

|}

Week 1

Pool J
Venue: Coliseo Eduardo Dibos, Lima, Peru

|}

Pool K
Venue: Coliseo Guillermo Angulo, Carolina, Puerto Rico

|}

Week 2

Pool L
Venue: Sportoase Leuven, Leuven, Belgium

|}

Pool M
Venue: Coliseo Gran Chimú, Trujillo, Peru

|}

Week 3

Pool N
Venue:  Microestadio Lomas de Zamora, Buenos Aires, Argentina

|}

Pool O
Venue: Topsport Centre Doetinchem, Doetinchem, Netherlands

|}

Group 3

Ranking

|}

Week 1

Pool P
Venue: Baluan Sports and Culture Palace, Almaty, Kazakhstan

|}

Pool Q
Venue: Olympic Gymnasium Juan de la Barrera, Mexico City, Mexico

|}

Week 2

Pool R
Venue: City Hall Brno, Brno, Czech Republic

|}

Pool S
Venue: Žatika Sport Centre, Poreč, Croatia

|}

Final round

Group 3
Venue: Arena Samokov, Samokov, Bulgaria

Semifinals

|}

3rd place match

|}

Final

|}

Group 2
Venue: Hala Widowwiskowo Sportowa, Koszalin, Poland

Semifinals

|}

3rd place match

|}

Final

|}

Group 1

Final Six
Venue:   Ariake Coliseum, Tokyo, Japan

|}

|}

Final standing

Awards

Most Valuable Player
  Yuko Sano
Best Outside Hitters
  Xiaotong Liu
  Miyu Nagaoka
Best Setter
  Danielle Lins

Best Middle Blockers
  Irina Fetisova
  Fabiana Claudino
Best Libero
  Yuko Sano
Best Opposite
  Sheilla Castro

References

External links
FIVB

FIVB World Grand Prix
FIVB World Grand Prix
International volleyball competitions hosted by Japan
Sports competitions in Tokyo
FIVB Volleyball World Grand Prix
FIVB Volleyball World Grand Prix